Lehigh Valley Steam was a soccer club that competed in the A-League in 1999. Based in Lehigh Valley, Pennsylvania, the club has problems securing a home stadium and folded after a single season. The club featured future U.S. national team player Kerry Zavagnin and was coached by Daryl Shore.

Year-by-year

Defunct soccer clubs in Pennsylvania
Sports in the Lehigh Valley
A-League (1995–2004) teams
1999 establishments in Pennsylvania
1999 disestablishments in Pennsylvania
Soccer clubs in Pennsylvania
Association football clubs established in 1999
Association football clubs disestablished in 1999